Tujunga can refer to a few different things:

 Tujunga, the Tongva village
 Tujunga (fly), a genus of picture-winged fly
 Sunland-Tujunga, Los Angeles, A neighborhood of the San Fernando valley
 Rancho Tujunga, a Mexican land grant that became Sunland and Tujunga, LA
 Tujunga Wash, a tributary of the Los Angeles River
 Big Tujunga Creek, which flows to the Tujunga Wash
 Big Tujunga Dam, spanning Big Tujunga Canyon in Los Angeles County